Miloslav Ošmera (21 January 1924 in Třebíč, Czechoslovakia – 11 March 2001) was a Czech ice hockey player who competed in the 1952 Winter Olympics.

References

External links

1929 births
2001 deaths
HC Vítkovice players
Ice hockey players at the 1952 Winter Olympics
Olympic ice hockey players of Czechoslovakia
Sportspeople from Třebíč
Czechoslovak ice hockey defencemen
Czech ice hockey defencemen
Czechoslovak ice hockey coaches
Czech ice hockey coaches
Czechoslovak expatriate ice hockey people
Czechoslovak expatriate sportspeople in Sweden